Evesbatch is a village and civil parish  north east of Hereford, in the county of Herefordshire, England. In 2001 the parish had a population of 63. The parish touches Acton Beauchamp, Bishop's Frome and Cradley and Storridge. Evesbatch shares a parish council with Acton Beauchamp and Stanford Bishop called "Acton Beauchamp Group Parish Council".

Landmarks 
There are 5 listed buildings in Evesbatch. Evesbatch has a church called St Andrew.

History 
The name "Evesbatch" means 'Esa's valley-stream'. Evesbatch was recorded in the Domesday Book as Sbech.

References

External links 

 
 Evesbatch old lake . Built pre-1900, part of the original Cadbury estate.

Villages in Herefordshire
Civil parishes in Herefordshire